This article shows all participating team squads at the 2019 Women's European Volleyball Championship, held in Hungary, Poland, Turkey and Slovakia from 23 August to 8 September 2019.

Pool A

The following is the Finnish roster in the 2019 European Championship.

Head coach: Tapio Kangasniemi

The following is the Serbian roster in the 2019 European Championship.

Head coach: Zoran Terzić

The following is the Turkish roster in the 2019 European Championship.

Head coach: Giovanni Guidetti

The following is the Bulgarian roster in the 2019 European Championship.

Head coach: Ivan Petkov

The following is the Greek roster in the 2019 European Championship.

Head coach:  Guillermo Naranjo Hernández

The following is the French roster in the 2019 European Championship.

Head coach: Emile Rousseaux

Pool B

The following is the Ukrainian roster in the 2019 European Championship.

Head coach: Gariy Yegiazarov

The following is the Italian roster in the 2019 European Championship.

Head coach: Davide Mazzanti

The following is the Belgian roster in the 2019 European Championship.

Head coach: Gert Van de Broek

The following is the Portuguese roster in the 2019 European Championship.

Head coach:  José Francisco Santos

The following is the Slovene roster in the 2019 European Championship.

Head coach:  Alessandro Chiappini

The following is the Polish roster in the 2019 European Championship.

Head coach: Jacek Nawrocki

Pool C

The following is the Croatian roster in the 2019 European Championship.

Head coach: Daniele Santarelli

The following is the Hungarian roster in the 2019 European Championship.

Head coach: Jan De Brandt

The following is the Estonian roster in the 2019 European Championship.

Head coach: Andrei Ojamets

The following is the Romanian roster in the 2019 European Championship.

Head coach:  Luciano Pedullà

The following is the Azerbaijan roster in the 2019 European Championship.

Head coach:  Giovanni Caprara

The following is the Dutch roster in the 2019 European Championship.

Head coach:  Jamie Morrison

Pool D

The following is the Slovak roster in the 2019 European Championship.

Head coach:  Marco Fenoglio

The following is the German roster in the 2019 European Championship.

Head coach: Felix Koslowski

The following is the Swiss roster in the 2019 European Championship.

Head coach: Timothy Lippuner

The following is the Russian roster in the 2019 European Championship.

Head coach: Vadim Pankov

The following is the Spanish roster in the 2019 European Championship.

Head coach: Pascual Saurin

The following is the Belarusian roster in the 2019 European Championship.

Head coach: Piotr Khilko

See also
 2019 Men's European Volleyball Championship squads

References

External links 

E
Women's European Volleyball Championship